Walter Dwight Wilcox (1869–1949) was an early explorer of the Canadian Rockies, especially in the Lake Louise region.

Life

Wilcox was educated at Phillips Academy, Andover (Class of 1889) and Yale University (1893).

Walter Wilcox is known for his 1890s discovery and exploration of Paradise Valley, Desolation Valley and Prospector Valley near Lake Louise. He is accredited with the first ascents of Mount Temple (3,543m), on Aug. 17, 1894 with Samuel E. S. Allen and Lewis Frissell.  Walter Wilcox made the first ascent on Mount Aberdeen (3,152m), Mount Niblock (2,976m), Mount Indefatigable (2,670m), and Cheops Mountain (2581m).

In 1898, Mount Wilcox (2,884m) in the Columbia Icefield area of Jasper National Park was named in Wilcox's honour by J. Norman Collie. The pass that provides easy access to Mt. Wilcox was also named Wilcox Pass.

Works
Camping in the Canadian Rockies: An Account of Camp Life in the Wilder Parts of the Canadian Rocky Mountains, Together with a Description of the Region About Banff, Lake Louise and Glacier, and a Sketch of the Early Explorations. G.P. Putnam's Sons, 1896 
The Rockies of Canada. G.P. Putnam's Sons, 1900 
 "Among the Mahogany Forests of Cuba," Walter D. Wilcox, National Geographic, July 1908, Vol. XIX No. 7.

References

External links
 
 
http://www.summitpost.org/wilcox-peak-mount-wilcox/153841
http://www.archives.gov/research/native-americans/pictures/select-list-003.html
 
American Alpine Club tribute

1869 births
1949 deaths
Canadian mountain climbers
Explorers of British Columbia